Petite Forte is a local service district and designated place in the Canadian province of Newfoundland and Labrador. It is on Placentia Bay and is connected by road via Route 215 (Petite Forte Road). Petite Forte is located on the Burin Peninsula which is on the southeast coast of the island of Newfoundland in the province of Newfoundland and Labrador. It fought attempts by the government in the 1960s to resettle. Petite Forte has a population of 69 according to the 2021 census.

The ferry MV Marine Coaster III has a port in Petite Forte and services the isolated outport of South East Bight.

Geography 
Petite Forte is in Newfoundland within Subdivision C of Division No. 2.

Demographics 

Government 
Petite Forte is a local service district (LSD) that is governed by a committee responsible for the provision of certain services to the community. The chair of the LSD committee is Kevin Hefferan.

See also 
List of designated places in Newfoundland and Labrador
List of local service districts in Newfoundland and Labrador
Newfoundland outport
South East Bight

References 

Populated coastal places in Canada
Designated places in Newfoundland and Labrador
Local service districts in Newfoundland and Labrador